Sun Pengxiang (born 16 January 1991) is a Paralympian athlete from China competing mainly in F41 classification throwing events.

Athletics career
Sun first represented China at a major international during the 2015 IPC Athletics World Championships in Doha, entering the shot put and javelin throw events. He finished fifth in the shot put, but finished on the podium in the javelin, throwing a new world record with a distance of 43.67 metes to take the gold medal. The following year he qualified for his first Paralympic Games, representing his country in the javelin at Rio de Janeiro. Sun was unable to replicate the form he had shown in Doha, but his best throw of 41.81 was enough to win him the bronze medal.

Notes

Living people
1991 births
Chinese male javelin throwers
Chinese male shot putters
Sportspeople from Inner Mongolia
Medalists at the 2016 Summer Paralympics
Paralympic bronze medalists for China
Athletes (track and field) at the 2016 Summer Paralympics
Paralympic medalists in athletics (track and field)
Paralympic athletes of China
Athletes (track and field) at the 2020 Summer Paralympics
21st-century Chinese people